The men's high jump event at the 1995 Summer Universiade was held on 30 August – 1 September at the Hakatanomori Athletic Stadium in Fukuoka, Japan.

Medalists

Results

Qualification
Qualification: 2.20 m (Q) or at least 12 best (q) qualified for the final.

Final

References

Athletics at the 1995 Summer Universiade
1995